is a Japanese professional baseball Infielders for the Chiba Lotte Marines of Nippon Professional Baseball.

Professional career

Fukuoka SoftBank Hawks
On October 22, 2015, Chatani was drafted  by the Fukuoka SoftBank Hawks in the 2015 Nippon Professional Baseball draft.

In 2016 season, he played in the Western League of NPB's minor leagues and played in informal matches against the Shikoku Island League Plus's teams.

On October 8, 2017, Chatani debuted in the Pacific League against the Tohoku Rakuten Golden Eagles, and recorded his first hit.

In 2018 season, he had no chance to play in the Pacific League. Fukuoka SoftBank Hawks offered Chatani a re-contract as a developmental player, but he declined. On November 4, Hawks has released him.

Chiba Lotte Marines
On January 23, 2019, Chiba Lotte Marines has signed with Chatani as a developmental squad player.

In 2019 season, Chatani played in the Eastern League of NPB's minor leagues. On December 25, he signed a 5 million yen contract with the Chiba Lotte Marines as a registered player under control.

In 2020 season, Chatani finished the regular season in 31 games with a batting average of .063, a one hit, a one stolen base.

References

External links

 Career statistics - NPB.jp
 67 茶谷 健太 選手名鑑2021 - Chiba Lotte Marines Official site 

1998 births
Living people
Chiba Lotte Marines players
Fukuoka SoftBank Hawks players
Japanese baseball players
Nippon Professional Baseball infielders
Baseball people from Kanagawa Prefecture
People from Chigasaki, Kanagawa